Prince Alexander Ivanovich Bagration (1771-1820) was a Georgian royal prince (batonishvili) of House of Mukhrani of a collateral branch of the royal Bagrationi dynasty.

He was a son of Prince Ivane. His brothers Pyotr Bagration and Roman Bagration were famous generals of the Russian imperial army.

Alexander had 5 children:
Aleksandra (unknown)
Pyotr (born 1806)
Nikoloz (born 1808)
Roman (born 1809)
Aleksandr (born 1815)

References

1771 births
1820 deaths
House of Mukhrani
Georgian princes